Local elections were  held for South Ribble Borough Council on 5 May 2011. Local elections are held every four years with all councillors up for election in multi-member electoral wards.

The Local Government Boundary Commission for England reviewed the electoral wards of South Ribble Borough Council in 2014 with the new electoral map to be elected for the first time at the 2015 South Ribble Borough Council election.

See also
South Ribble

References
 South Ribble Borough Council (pdf)

2011 English local elections
2011
2010s in Lancashire